Mimmo Catania (born 1955 in Vittoria, Sicily) is a painter. He works also as a graphic artist, draftsman, photographer, installation artist and writer.

Life 
He attended the Academy of Fine Arts in Urbino where he studied painting from 1980 to 1984, and moved after graduation to Berlin where he has been living ever since.

Career 
In 1995, he was artist in residence at Art/Omi Artists international Residency, Ghent N.Y., supported by the Senate of Berlin, in 1996, he spent six months in Israel with a grant from KULTURFONDs Berlin, where he was also invited as a lecturer at the Haifa University, Department of Fine Arts, and at the Wizo College. In 1998, he was artist in residence for six months at the Casa di Goethe, thanks to a grant of the DaimlerCrysler Foundation, Rome.

In 2005, he received the Pollock-Krasner Foundation Grant, New York, and again in 2016.

In 2007, he was artist in residence at the Santa Fe Art Institute, Santa Fe, with a grant of the Joan Mitchell Foundation, New York, and in 2008 in Beijing.

Works 
Catania mainly works as a painter in oil on canvas. At the beginning of his artistic career he was strongly influenced by informal art, which allowed him to create artworks in his very own personal style.
Following a residency at the Casa di Goethe in Rome in 1998 Catania turned to figurative art by developing a very special language which he calls ‘meta-realism’. They recall images which belong to our collective memory. They deal with crises of identity, aggression and loneliness, as virulent phenomena of our time.

In the series of ‘Attacks’ (2013) or ‘Burning cars’ (2014) Catania turned to topics of crude and primordial energy.

Other works capture spaces/interiors that are impossible to define, in which volatile light sources mark unstable levels of reality.

In his paintings gestural expressions are severely reduced. The focus is on the absence rather than on the presence, backgrounds swap with foregrounds, the rules of perspective are suspended, interiors are bloated. The cohesion of the world is in dissolution, pattern of carpets, ornaments have gained their own lives, various light sources are disorientating, reflections make it impossible to understand what is inside and what is outside of one’s sphere.

Writings 
His novel “Quattro secondi di Nero” was published in 2018 by Albatros/Il Filo, Rome. Ranging from comic to grotesque, it deals with the contemporary art market, “inspired”, as the author says “by not entirely unlikely events.”

Residencies and grants

Solo exhibitions (selection)

Group exhibitions (selection)

Catalogues (selection) 
“Odd One Out”, Verlag für zeitgenössische Kunst und Theorie, Berlin, 2017
“Overturn”, Galleria Civica d’Arte Contemporanea Montevergini, Siracusa, 2016
“Storm”, Torrance Art Museum, Torrance, CA, 2015
“Reunion | Works 1982–2012”, Verlag für zeitgenössische Kunst und Theorie, Berlin, 2012
“Markers”, 49. Biennale di Venezia, Venice, 2001
“Schattensprung”, Warsaw -Berlin, Museumspädagogischer Dienst Berlin, 1994
“Reflessioni”, Galerie Lou-Lou Lazard, Berlin, 1990

Works in Public Collections 
Works by Mimmo Catania are in the Francis Greenburger Collection, New York, DaimlerChrysler Casa di Goethe, Rome, Museum Bagheria, Bagheria, Center for Contemporary Art, Warsaw, Künstlerförderung des Landes Berlin, IIC,Los Angeles, IIC, Colonia, Tallinn City Hall, Tallinn, Galleria Civica Arte Contemporanea, Marsala, Santa Fe Art Institute, Santa Fe

Interviews (selection) 
2016      Brainard Carey: Interviews from Yale University Radio WYBCX 
2013      Marie j Burrows: Painting no-place but still smiling. Artparasites, Berlin
2009      Selma Karadza: Unexpectedly on the Expected Events. Depo Portal, Sarajevo

References

External links 
http://www.mimmocatania.com

1955 births
Living people
Painters from Sicily
People from Vittoria, Sicily